The Weerdinge Men is the name given to two bog bodies found in 1904 in Weerdinge, Drenthe, in the southern part of Bourtange moor, in the Netherlands. Radiocarbon dating shows that they likely died between 160 BC and 220 AD. At first, it was believed that one of the two bodies was female, which led to the name "Weerdinge Couple", or, more popular, "Mr. and Mrs. Veenstra", veen being the Dutch term for bog and "Veenstra" being a common Dutch surname.

Pathology
The more complete Weerdinge Man had a large wound on his chest, through which his intestines spilled out. Some observers believe that this points to a ritualistic purpose for the killing. Strabo, a Roman historian, recounts tales of Iron Age Europeans attempting to divine the future by "reading entrails."  The cause of death of the other Weerdinge Man is unknown.

References

1904 archaeological discoveries
Archaeological discoveries in the Netherlands
Bog bodies
Drents Museum